Saccolabiopsis armitii, commonly known as the spotted pitcher orchid, is an epiphytic orchid from the family Orchidaceae. It has a short stem, coarse, wiry roots, between three and six crowded, curved leaves and up to fifty yellowish green flowers with red markings and a white labellum. It usually grows in coastal scrub to rainforest in New Guinea and tropical North Queensland, Australia.

Description
The side lobes are triangular and the middle lobe is short and rounded. Flowering occurs from September to December.

Taxonomy and naming
The spotted pitcher orchid was first formally described in 1875 by Ferdinand von Mueller and given the name Sarcochilus armitii. The description was published in Fragmenta phytographiae Australiae. In 1886, Frederick Manson Bailey changed the name to Saccolabiopsis armitii. The specific epithet (armitii) honours William Armit who collected the type specimen.

Distribution and habitat
It is found in New Guinea and in Queensland between Weipa and Bundaberg.

References

Aeridinae
Epiphytic orchids
Endemic orchids of Australia
Orchids of Queensland
Orchids of New Guinea
Plants described in 1875
Taxa named by Ferdinand von Mueller